The 2011 Men's Hockey RaboTrophy was the fourth edition of the men's field hockey tournament. The RaboTrophy was held in Amsterdam from 29 June to 2 July 2011, and featured four of the top nations in men's field hockey.

The Netherlands won the tournament for the second time, finishing top of the ladder at the conclusion of the pool stage.

The tournament was held in conjunction with the Women's FIH Champions Trophy.

Competition format
The four teams competed in a pool stage, played in a single round robin format. Standings at the conclusion of the pool stage determined final placings.

Teams
The following four teams competed for the title:

Officials
The following umpires were appointed by the International Hockey Federation to officiate the tournament:

 Daniel Barstow (ENG)
 Fabian Bläsch (GER)
 Coen van Bunge (NED)
 Haider Rasool (PAK)
 Marcelo Servetto (ESP)

Results
All times are local (Central European Time).

Pool

Fixtures

Statistics

Final standings

Goalscorers

References

External links
Official Website

RaboTrophy
Hockey RaboTrophy
Men's Hockey RaboTrophy
Hockey RaboTrophy
Hockey RaboTrophy
Sports competitions in Amstelveen